Greg LeMond is an American cyclist.

LeMond or Lemond may also refer to:
 LeMond Racing Cycles, a bicycle manufacturer founded by Greg LeMond
 Bob LeMond, American radio and television announcer
 Lemond Township, Steele County, Minnesota, United States
 Lemond (alcohol)

See also
Le Monde